Paljarahu  is a small island in the Baltic Sea belonging to the country of Estonia.

Paljarahu lies off of the western coast of Estonia in the Väinameri Strait, northwest of the island of Tagarahu and south of the island of Mustarahu. Paljarahu occupies an area of 2.737 ha, with a circumference of approximately. 0.887 km. 

It is administered by the mainland village of Puise in Ridala Parish, Lääne County. 

The island and surrounding area are protected as part of Matsalu National Park.

References

Estonian islands in the Baltic
Ridala Parish